Dullstroom, also known as Emnothweni, is a small town in Mpumalanga province, South Africa. Dullstroom lies on the Highveld platea that is found in South Africa, and is the reason that its climate is so different from the surrounding areas.

Along with Barkly East and Underberg, it is one of South Africa's premier flyfishing destinations.

History
The area was occupied in the mid-19th century by the Southern Ndebele people under the rule of King Mabhoko (called Mapoch by white settlers). Like his son Nyabêla, Mabhoko used Mapoch's Caves as a hideout during conflict with troops of the South African Republic (ZAR). The most violent fighting took place from 1882 to 1883. The nearby Fort Mapoch and a statue of Nyabêla are major attractions in Dullstroom.

Dullstroom was established as the work of a settlement company founded in 1883 by its namesake Dutchman Wolterus Dull, at the invitation of State President of the South African Republic Paul Kruger, to settle Dutch immigrants. Dull, a merchant from Amsterdam, chairman of a committee which rendered assistance to families who had suffered losses during the First Anglo-Boer War. The element stroom, ‘stream’, refers to the Crocodile River nearby. The company purchased the farms Groot Suikerboschkop and Elandslaagte as the nucleus of the fledgling settlement, including housing for the settlers on the former. The village was proclaimed a town by Kruger in Dull's honor on October 9, 1893.

Settlers continued to immigrate from 1884 to 1887. By 1893, the population had reached 48 people in eight houses, served by three stables, ten cattle pens, and a small trading company and store.

While many of the men joined the rebels in the Second Boer War, the women and children were held in the British concentration camp in Belfast. After the Battle of Bergendal, guerrilla fighting continued in the area for a while. During the war, the town was destroyed and most of the settlers returned to the Netherlands.

Only two buildings were left standing after the war, but some of the residents returned to rebuild the town, however. The church was rebuilt in 1905. In 1921, the first city council met. After fly fishing, originally a New England pastime, became popular with the wealthy residents of Johannesburg, properties with trout dams were purchased, which are still used today.

Climate
Due to its high elevation (Dullstroom being the highest town in South Africa itself), Dullstroom has a subtropical highland climate (Köppen: Cwb). From October to April, the town sees a significant amount of rainfall (higher than nearby Johannesburg to the west), in contrast with winter, where precipitation lacks.

Its relatively cool and temperate climate has made Dullstroom the only place in South Africa where beech and elm trees grow, which were originally planted by Dutch colonists.

Culture

The festival is organised by Proudly Dullstroom and the inaugural event was hosted at The Duck & Trout in September 2017.

The Dullstroom Winter Festival is held every July and brings the whole community together. It also attracts people from all over South Africa. Music by local South African artists is the main attraction. The festival also hosts a kid's zone for young visitors as well as food stalls, artist exhibits, and whisky pairings stands.

The Dimitrov Art Gallery is run by the well established artist Branko Dimitrov who also does on site commissioned portrait paintings.

The Robert Badenhorst Art Gallery sells South African art from paintings to sculptures.

The Anvil Ale Brewery on the outskirts of town is a microbrewery that produces a Blonde Ale, a Pale Ale and a Baltic Porter.

References

External links

Dullstroom accommodation and info

Populated places in the Emakhazeni Local Municipality
Populated places established in 1893